Mohamed Abouelghar (born October 1, 1993 in Cairo) is a professional squash player who represents Egypt. He reached a career-high ranking of World No. 7 in June 2019.

References

External links 
 
 

1993 births
Living people
Egyptian male squash players
21st-century Egyptian people